Cross-dominance, also known as mixed-handedness, hand confusion, or mixed dominance, is a motor skill manifestation in which a person favors one hand for some tasks and the other hand for others, or a hand and the contralateral leg. For example, a cross-dominant person might write with the right hand and do everything else with the left one, or manage and kick a ball preferentially with the left leg.

It can also refer to mixed laterality, which refers to a person favoring eyes, ears, feet, or hands on one side of the body. A person who is cross-dominant can also be stronger on the opposite side of the body that they favor; for example, a right-handed person can be stronger on the left side. Cross-dominance can often be a problem when shooting or in activities that require aim, although athletes can still achieve success in sports that require accuracy, like passing in American football and shooting in basketball.

In baseball 

In baseball a left-handed batter is about two steps closer to first base than a right-handed batter, one important advantage. Because curveballs and sliders – the most commonly used breaking pitches in the game – curve in the direction of a pitcher's non-throwing hand, a batter who bats opposite the pitcher's throwing hand enjoys an advantage. Since most pitchers are right-handed, left-handed batters enjoy a second  advantage over their right-handed counterparts. However, right-handed throwing is more valuable in the infield. Every fielding position can be played by a right-handed thrower, although left-handers are considered more valuable pitchers and have a slight advantage at first base owing to the fact that they do not have to turn around to place their foot on first when stretching to catch a throw, and because their gloved hand is closer to the runner on pick-off plays. Conversely, left-handed throwers are almost completely absent at the highest level at the other infield positions and at catcher. Switch hitting exists so a batter can hit from the side opposite every pitcher's throwing arm, but it has gained some criticism because a batter will always be more dominant from one side of the plate than the other; the switch hitter may be less reliable from one side. So, many baseball players are trained to be simply cross-dominant, batting solely left-handed and throwing solely right-handed. There are a few position players, such as Rickey Henderson and Cleon Jones, who bat right and throw left, but this serves as a substantial disadvantage. Henderson batted right despite his natural inclination to do so left-handed only because he was taught to  do so by right-handed teammates.

See also 
 Ambidexterity

References

External links 

Handedness